The U.S. city of Minneapolis is officially defined by the Minneapolis City Council as divided into eleven communities, each containing multiple official neighborhoods. Informally, there are city areas with colloquial labels. Residents may also group themselves by their city street suffixes, North, Northeast, South, Southeast, and Southwest.

Description

General areas 
The local community defines several general areas based on the directional suffixes added to streets in the city. These city areas do not necessarily correlate with official community or neighborhood definitions.

Downtown Minneapolis refers to the street grid area aligned on a diagonal with the Mississippi River bend, as opposed to the true north-south grid orientation. The area north of downtown on the west bank of the Mississippi River is considered North Minneapolis. The part of Minneapolis on the east bank of the Mississippi River is divided by East Hennepin Avenue into Northeast and Southeast, approximately aligned with the communities of Northeast and University, respectively. 

The entire area south of downtown is widely referred to as South Minneapolis. The westerly portion surrounding the city's famed Chain of Lakes is loosely labeled Southwest Minneapolis, bounded on the east by I-35W and on the north by 36th St W, which extends west from Bde Maka Ska (formerly Lake Calhoun) to the city limits.

Common conceptions of Minneapolis neighborhoods do not always align with official city maps, especially since much of the Minneapolis–Saint Paul metropolitan area's population now lives outside of the two major cities. Due to this, residents on the borders of surrounding cities may sometimes refer to themselves as living in a bordering community. Twin Cities residents and visitors frequently use generalized names based on geography, such as "North Minneapolis". What most people would consider North Minneapolis is a combination of the Near North and Camden communities, each of which is made up of several neighborhoods. This similarly applies to neighborhoods, with residents living by definition in one neighborhood, but classifying themselves to be in another.

Official communities and neighborhoods 

The city council, made up of one representative from each of the city's 13 wards, has legislative authority to define neighborhood boundaries. Community and neighborhood boundaries are not the same as the Ward boundaries, which are adjusted after each decennial census. 

Minneapolis consists of 11 communities, each of which are subdivided into anywhere between 4 and 13 neighborhoods. The official neighborhoods have a variety of origins; some were formed out of the attendance areas for elementary schools, while others are the areas of coverage of neighborhood associations formed by activists between 1901 and the 1980s. The division of the city into official neighborhoods and communities occurred as part of the Neighborhood Revitalization Program (NRP) in the early 1990s. They remain associated with this community-based funding program, and are also used for statistical purposes. For purposes of the NRP, some of the 81 official neighborhoods have combined forces, leading to a total of 67 NRP Neighborhood action plans.

Neighborhoods historically defined themselves around schools and commercial hubs, and many trace neighborhood identity back into community organizations formed in the early part of the 20th century. The oldest, the Prospect Park East River Road Association formed in 1901 to oppose city plans to level Tower Hill. In other neighborhoods, the current official neighborhood association was formed in the 1970s and 1980s; in Linden Hills, the organization was formed in 1972 in response to proposed changes in the park, although there were several social and commercial organizations in the neighborhood dating back to the neighborhood's development at the turn of the 20th century.

List of  neighborhoods by community

Calhoun-Isles

Camden

Central

Longfellow

Near North

Nokomis

Northeast

Phillips

Powderhorn

Southwest

University

Other areas

Unofficial districts 

Many of the major business districts of the city sit on major thoroughfares, and since these thoroughfares also form the boundaries of official neighborhoods, local identity may not correspond with these official neighborhoods. Lake Street, running the entire width of the city in south Minneapolis is a string of commercial districts which includes Uptown, Lyn-Lake and Midtown, while forming the border of 12 neighborhoods. Other streets with similar linking and bordering qualities include Nicollet Avenue, stringing together Nicollet Mall, Eat Street south of Franklin Avenue, and smaller districts south of Lake Street; Central Avenue, which links downtown to Old St Anthony Village via the Third Avenue Bridge and then continues on to form a core commercial district of Northeast around Lowry Avenue; and University Avenue, which joins Old St Anthony to Dinkytown, and then continues into Midway and the State Capitol in Saint Paul.

The Little Earth community and surrounding area has been at the center of the American Indian Movement.

Uptown is probably the most well-known business district in Minneapolis besides downtown, centered at the intersection of West Lake Street and Hennepin Avenue, but it is not officially recognized as it includes parts of four neighborhoods: South Uptown, East Bde Maka Ska, East Isles, and Lowry Hill East. The Uptown Business Association is focused on the area within a few blocks of Lake and Hennepin, but the "Uptown" identity can stretch as far north as Franklin Avenue, and as far east as Lyndale Avenue, where it now merges into Lyn-Lake.

Eat Street is the newest of Minneapolis's commercial district, formed in the late 1990s to promote the international variety of restaurants along Nicollet Avenue South within three blocks of 26th Street. Nicollet was historically the "Main Street" of the Whittier neighborhood, but was cut off from Lake Street by construction of a K-Mart. The named district was an effort to give the neighborhood a fresh identity.

The Old St. Anthony district, commonly known as Northeast, straddles the neighborhoods of Marcy-Holmes, and Nicollet Island/East Bank, both of which are part of the University community, rather than Northeast. It was the downtown for the city of St. Anthony before it joined Minneapolis in 1872.

Dinkytown is the coined name for an area just north of the University of Minnesota within the official Marcy-Holmes neighborhood, heavily populated by students. A row of historic fraternity houses along University Avenue is referred to as "fraternity row." Similarly, Stadium Village on the east end of campus is named for the now-demolished Memorial Stadium and is officially part of Prospect Park neighborhood (the name makes sense again now that nearby Huntington Bank Stadium, formerly known as TCF Bank Stadium, was completed in 2009).

The Warehouse District was a 19th and early 20th-century rail and  truck shipping center for the region. In the 1970s and 1980s it became an artists quarter, and then a nightlife and entertainment district, which the southern portion (between I-394 and Hennepin Ave) remains. The district is largely within the North Loop neighborhood, but the heart of the entertainment district lies in the Downtown West neighborhood.

As the Mississippi riverfront downtown has been redeveloped since the 1980s, there have been several attempts at "rebranding" it. The "Mississippi Mile" spanned both sides of the river, but never really caught on locally. Saint Anthony Main, the name of the commercial development, came to refer to the section of the East Bank around it. More recently, people have come to refer to the West Bank between 3rd Avenue and the University as "The Mills District", though the name more properly applies to both sides of the river

Some neighborhoods enjoy nicknames such as Lowry Hill East which known as "The Wedge" because of its shape. However the Wedge Co-op, originally located in the Wedge area, moved to its current location on Lyndale Avenue S in the Whittier neighborhood in the 1980s. Local amenities are also taken on as nicknames. Minnehaha refers to the businesses by Minnehaha Falls rather than along Minnehaha Avenue, and Tower (Hill) which is located along University Avenue SE in Prospect Park refers to the Witch's Hat Tower.

A historically significant neighborhood known as Homewood lies within Willard-Hay in Near North, spanning from Penn to Xerxes Avenues North between Plymouth Avenue and Oak Park Avenue. The district was deemed eligible for the National Register of Historic Places by the State Historic Preservation Office in 2002. It is architecturally and culturally significant due primarily to settlement by Jewish families during the first half of the twentieth century, when Minneapolis was openly anti-Semitic. In the 1930s the Homewood subdivision was the center of the North Side Jewish community, populated by a middle- and upper-middle-class families. The City of Minneapolis began a formal review process for potential historic designation of the district in 2016.

Cultural districts 
In 2020, the city designated seven new cultural districts to promote racial equity, preserve cultural identity, and promote economic growth: 38th Street, Cedar Avenue South, Central Avenue, East Lake Street, Franklin Avenue East, West Broadway, and Lowry Avenue North.

See also
 Neighborhoods in Saint Paul

Notes

External links

Cornerstones: A History Of North Minneapolis Documentary produced by Twin Cities Public Television

Minneapolis
Communities in Minneapolis